Patrik Norinder (born 1941) is a Swedish politician of the Moderate Party, member of the Riksdag 1991–2006.

References

Members of the Riksdag from the Moderate Party
Living people
1941 births
Members of the Riksdag 2002–2006
Place of birth missing (living people)
Date of birth missing (living people)